Kyzyl-Döbö is a village in Kochkor District of Naryn Region in Kyrgyzstan. Its population was 2,239 in 2021.

References
 

Populated places in Naryn Region